Críona Ní Dhálaigh (born 11 February 1962) is an Irish Sinn Féin politician who served as Lord Mayor of Dublin from 2015 to 2016. She was a Dublin City Councillor from March 2006 to September 2020.

She was co-opted onto Dublin City Council in 2006, to fill a vacancy caused by the resignation of Andrew O'Connell. She was elected in 2009 for the South West Inner City area and in 2014 for the Crumlin-Kimmage area.

References

 

20th-century Irish people
21st-century Irish people
Sinn Féin politicians
Lord Mayors of Dublin
1962 births
Living people